Gilbert Planté (15 March 1941 – 20 October 2010) was a French footballer. He competed in the men's tournament at the 1968 Summer Olympics.

References

External links
 

1941 births
2010 deaths
French footballers
Olympic footballers of France
Footballers at the 1968 Summer Olympics
Footballers from Marseille
Association football defenders
Mediterranean Games gold medalists for France
Mediterranean Games medalists in football
Competitors at the 1967 Mediterranean Games